The Calvary Episcopal Church is located at 3766 Clifton Avenue, in the Clifton.  It is part of the Clifton Avenue Historic District.  Its Sunday School is a historic building listed in the National Register on March 3, 1980.

Calvary Episcopal Church began in a small, frame schoolhouse on the eastern side of Clifton Avenue. The first services were held in 1844. Four years later, a frame church was built at the northwest corner of Clifton and Lafayette Avenue and was named "The Clifton Chapel". The "Calvery" church was incorporated in 1863 according to the statutes of the State of Ohio. Construction began in 1866 and was completed in 1867, the first building committee chairman was Henry Probasco. Construction cost was approximately $88,300.

The gothic revival style of the church was complementary to the mansions of the neighborhood. The tower and bell were donated by Mr. and Mrs. Henry Probasco in memory of their brother, Tyler Davidson. Other church memorials still utter the names of the Shoenbergers, the Probascos, the Resors, the Neaves and the Bowlers.

It is one of multiple places associated with architect Samuel Hannaford that were listed on the National Register as part of a 1978 Thematic Resource study.

Notable people
 Hulda Regina Graser (1870-1943), Canadian-born American customs house broker, was a parishoner

References

External links

Official Site
History of Churches of Hamilton County
Calvary Episcopal Church, (circa 1910)

National Register of Historic Places in Cincinnati
Episcopal churches in Ohio
Episcopal churches in Cincinnati
Churches completed in 1867
19th-century Episcopal church buildings
Samuel Hannaford church buildings